Valentine Hollingsworth (August 15, 1632 – October 13, 1710) was an Irish Quaker settler of Brandywine Hundred in the Delaware Colony in the late 17th century.

Hollingsworth was born to Henry and Catherine Hollingsworth in County Armagh, Ireland. The family had moved from Northern Cheshire, England. He first married in 1655 to Anne Rea (1628-1671), by whom he had four children, then in 1672 to Anne Calvert, by whom he had four more children.

Hollingsworth was converted to Quakerism by George Fox while in Ireland and suffered religious persecution. He stopped attending religious services at the Church of Ireland and was fined and had his supply of grain confiscated. In 1682 he and his family sailed for the Delaware Colony from Belfast, on the ship Antelope. William Penn granted him 968 acres of land between Shellpot Creek to Blue Ball, Delaware in what is now Wilmington, Delaware. The Quaker settlers rotated religious services between their houses until Hollingsworth donated land for the creation of a meetinghouse and the Newark Union Burial Ground.

Hollingsworth was a member of the First Assembly of the Province of Pennsylvania. He served as a justice of the peace. He was one of the signers of William Penn's Great Charter.

He died on October 13, 1710 and was interred at Newark Union Burial Ground.  A large monument marks the site of his burial.

Citations

Sources

External links
Descendants of Robert Holllingsworth of Hollingworth, Cheshire, England
Descendants of Henry Hollingsworth 7th great grandfather

1632 births
1710 deaths
American Quakers
Burials in New Castle County, Delaware
Hollingsworth
Converts to Quakerism
Irish Quakers
Kingdom of Ireland emigrants to the Thirteen Colonies
People of colonial Delaware